Lilala is a community council located in the Maseru District of Lesotho. Its population in 2006 was 24,195.

Villages
The community of Lilala includes the villages of

Aupolasi
Bolometsa (Ha Tšukulu)
Ha Hlalele
Ha Hlao
Ha Khabisi
Ha Khotšeng
Ha Leboea
Ha Lekhafola
Ha Letsie (Tšoeneng)
Ha Makae
Ha Makhobotlela
Ha Malelu
Ha Mapholo
Ha Mareka
Ha Matabane
Ha Moeti
Ha Mohloai (Mokauli)
Ha Mokhele
Ha Molungoa
Ha Morakanyane

Ha Mosala
Ha Mosamo
Ha Mosoeunyane
Ha Mosunkutu
Ha Musi
Ha Neo
Ha Ntaote
Ha Ntšohi
Ha Osteng
Ha Pelei
Ha Phakoane
Ha Pita
Ha Rahlao
Ha Ramaphiri
Ha Ramatekane
Ha Ramohapi
Ha Ramokitimi
Ha Rankhelepe
Ha Rantulela

Ha Raphae
Ha Rasebonang
Ha Rasekoai
Ha Rasekoja
Ha Ratau
Ha Sankoe
Ha Sekoati (Rikabe)
Ha Sello
Ha Sentšoantšo
Ha Tamane
Ha Thebesoa
Ha Tholo (Matebeleng)
Ha Tjamela
Ha Tlali
Ha Tlelase
Ha Tlhakanelo
Ha Tsautse
Hlakoaneng
Joala-Boholo (Tšoeneng)

Lerakong
Leralleng
Letlapeng
Libataolong
Liqoabing
Mahuu
Malimong
Masite (Ha Bereng)
Masite's Nek
Matateng
Motse-Mocha
Rothe
Sekoting
Taung
Thabana-Tšooana(Mankholo)
Thotaneng
Topa
Tšieng

References

External links
 Google map of community villages

Populated places in Maseru District